Dhauli Express is a 2007 Indian Odia-language film written and directed by Chittaranjan Tripathy. It features Samaresh Routray, Mihir Das, Siddhanta Mahapatra, Anu Choudhury, Aparajita Mohanty. The film was produced by Chittaranjan Triparthy. It won the Odisha State Film Award for Best Film in 2007.

Cast
Siddhanta Mahapatra as Jaga Bhai
Samaresh Routray as Dhauli Das 
Mihir Das as Dibkar Das
Aparajita Mohanty as Dhauli's mother
Anu Choudhury as Tila
Rabi Mishra as Pacha

Plot
Dhauli Express portrays an ambitious youth "Dhauli" (Samaresh Routray), Son of Dibakar Das (Mihir Das), who is a post man. Dhauli wants to become a singer. but due to odd circumstances of life he gets involved with Jaga bhai (Siddhanta Mahapatra) into crime world for money.

Soundtrack
The Music for the film is composed by Chittaranjan Tripathy

References

External links 
 

2007 films
2000s Odia-language films